The Beijing EX3 or previously the BJEV EX3 is a front-motor, five-door all-electric subcompact hatchback marketed by BAIC Motor Electric Vehicle Co Ltd. The maker is a wholly owned subsidiary of BAIC Group. The EX3 was marketed under the Beijing brand as of 2020.

History 

The EX3 was originally previewed as the EX3 Concept on the 2018 Beijing Auto Show. The production model is launched in the same year despite having a very different appearance. 

The production EX3 was sold under the BJEV product line, and The price range of the BJEV EX3 at launch was 133,900 yuan to 163,900 yuan. As of 2020, the BJEV branding was replaced by the Beijing brand.

Specifications
The motor powering the Beijing EX3 has a peak power at 160 kW and peak torque at 300 Nm. The range depends on the different models with the new-for-2020 R500 capable of a range of 421 km (NEDC). A limited edition model launched at the end of 2019 is capable of a range of 476 km, and the R600 is capable of a range of 501 km. 

The Beijing EX3 is equipped with ternary lithium batteries, with an electronic control system monitoring the vehicle, aiding battery life, acceleration, and driver control. The EX3 also features voice control for sat-nav, a fixed sunroof, and multimedia functions.

Design controversies
Styling of the BJEV EX3 is controversial, as the exterior design heavily resembles the Chevrolet Bolt EV.

See also 
Chevrolet Bolt
Government incentives for plug-in electric vehicles
List of modern production plug-in electric vehicles
List of production battery electric vehicles
Plug-in electric vehicle

References

External links 

Official website

BJEV EX3
Production electric cars
Subcompact cars
Cars introduced in 2018
Hatchbacks
2010s cars
2020s cars